The 1995 Virginia Cavaliers football team represented the University of Virginia during the 1995 NCAA Division I-A football season. The team's head coach was George Welsh. They played their home games at Scott Stadium in Charlottesville, Virginia.

Schedule

Roster

Game summaries

Michigan

William & Mary

NC State

Georgia Tech

Clemson

Wake Forest

North Carolina

Duke

Texas

Florida State

Virginia became the first ACC team to beat Florida State since the Seminoles joined the conference in 1992.

Maryland

Virginia Tech

1995 Peach Bowl

References

Virginia
Virginia Cavaliers football seasons
Atlantic Coast Conference football champion seasons
Peach Bowl champion seasons
Virginia Cavaliers football